Suphisellus tenuicornis is a species of burrowing water beetle in the subfamily Noterinae. It was described by Louis Alexandre Auguste Chevrolat in 1863 and is found in Cuba.

References

Suphisellus
Beetles described in 1863
Endemic fauna of Cuba